Conisania poelli is a species of moth of the family Noctuidae. It is found in Austria, Switzerland, Italy, Romania, Daghestan and Russia.

Subspecies
Conisania poelli poelli
Conisania poelli daghestanica Varga & Ronkay, 1991
Conisania poelli ostrogovichi Draudt, 1933

References

External links
Lepiforum.de

Moths described in 1915
Hadenini
Moths of Europe